Richard A. Freeman (July 21, 1933 – June 29, 2009) was a world champion American bridge player holding the title of World Grand Master, the highest title of the World Bridge Federation. He won the Bermuda Bowl world team championship and won many national championships. Freeman was inducted into the ACBL Hall of Fame in 2001. At the time of his death he held 17,880 masterpoints.

Early life

He was born in 1933, and was from Atlanta, Georgia. He was a radio Quiz Kid in 1942. In 1952, Freeman became the youngest Life Master in the ACBL ever at that time. In January 1964, he became editor of newly published Modern Bridge magazine. In 1993 he was a founding member of the Nick Nickell team where he played until his death as Nickell's professional partner. He died in Atlanta.

By age 13 Freeman was in his third year at the University of Chicago. He later graduated from the University of Chicago and received a J.D. from George Washington University.

Bridge accomplishments

Honors

 ACBL Hall of Fame 2001

Awards

 Fishbein Trophy (1) 1995

Wins

 Bermuda Bowl (3) 1995, 2000, 2003 
 North American Bridge Championships (22)
 von Zedtwitz Life Master Pairs (1) 2003 
 Vanderbilt (2) 1979, 2000 
 Marcus Cup (1) 1953 
 Mitchell Board-a-Match Teams (3) 1955, 1962, 1966 
 Chicago Mixed Board-a-Match (1) 1961 
 Reisinger (6) 1993, 1994, 1995, 2004, 2005, 2008 
 Spingold (8) 1993, 1994, 1995, 1996, 1998, 1999, 2004, 2006

Runners-up

 Bermuda Bowl (2) 1997, 2005 
 Buffett Cup (1) 2008
 North American Bridge Championships (14)
 Silodor Open Pairs (1) 2007 
 Blue Ribbon Pairs (1) 1970 
 Grand National Teams (1) 1983 
 Vanderbilt (3) 1975, 1996, 2002 
 Mitchell Board-a-Match Teams (6) 1957, 1958, 1977, 1983, 1998, 1999 
 Reisinger (1) 1965 
 Spingold (1) 1959

References

External links
 
 

1933 births
2009 deaths
American contract bridge players
Bermuda Bowl players
People from Atlanta
George Washington University Law School alumni
University of Chicago alumni